Košická Polianka is a village and large municipality in Košice-okolie District in the Kosice Region of eastern Slovakia.

History
In historical records the village was first mentioned in 1335 by its Hungarian name Lengenfolua when it belonged to Drugeth and Cudar families which possessed Trstené pri Hornáde. In 1337, the village passed to Krásna nad Hornádom’s abbey. It was recorded in 1337 as Lengen, in 1427 as Lengenfalva, in 1519 as Lengelfalva, in 1630 as Lengyelfalva. The village later became a Kassa (now:Košice) town estate and  successively it belonged to the Palasthy family. According to legends, the village seems to have been established by Polish settlers.

Geography
The village lies at an altitude of 195 metres and covers an area of 8.216 km².
It has a population of about 90 people.

External links

http://www.cassovia.sk/kpolianka/

Villages and municipalities in Košice-okolie District